Vyacheslav Chistyakov is a Russian professional ice hockey forward who currently plays for Avtomobilist Yekaterinburg of the Kontinental Hockey League (KHL).

References

Living people
Avtomobilist Yekaterinburg players
Year of birth missing (living people)
Russian ice hockey forwards